Guy Caron (born May 13, 1968) is a Canadian politician, who was elected the mayor of Rimouski, Quebec in the 2021 Quebec municipal elections. He was previously a member of the House of Commons of Canada from 2011 to 2019, and served as the federal House leader of the New Democratic Party from 2017 to 2019, substituting for party leader Jagmeet Singh who during this time did not hold a seat.

Caron was elected to the House of Commons of Canada in the 2011 election. He represented the electoral district of Rimouski-Neigette—Témiscouata—Les Basques as a member of the New Democratic Party (NDP). He was the NDP's critic for Finance and the Atlantic Canada Opportunities Agency, but resigned from the NDP's shadow cabinet in February 2017 to pursue leadership of the New Democratic Party of Canada.

On October 4, 2017, Jagmeet Singh, the newly elected NDP leader, appointed Caron to serve as the NDP's parliamentary leader. He relinquished this position on February 25, 2019 upon Singh's election to parliament from the riding of Burnaby South. Caron lost his seat in the 2019 Canadian federal election.

Early life and career
Caron was born in Rimouski, Quebec. He has a bachelor's degree in communications from the University of Ottawa in 1992, and served two terms as president of their student federation in 1992-94. He was vice-president of the board of directors of Voyages Campus/Travel Cuts, 1994. He was national president of the Canadian Federation of Students for two terms in 1994-6. He also has a master's degree in economics from Université du Québec à Montréal in 2001.

Prior to being elected, Caron was a researcher and economist with the Communications, Energy and Paperworkers Union of Canada, most recently as Director of Special Projects. He previously worked for the Council of Canadians where he was a media relations officer, then the Campaigner on Canada-U.S. Relations, and then the Healthcare Campaigner. He has also worked for the Canadian Race Relations Foundation. He is also a former journalist: he worked with radio stations CKLE and CKMN-FM, and with the newspapers Progrès-Écho and Rimouskois while studying science at the Cégep de Rimouski.

He is the author of Crossing the Line: A Citizens’ Inquiry on Canada-U.S. Relations.

Political career
Caron ran in Rimouski-Neigette—Témiscouata—Les Basques as the NDP candidate in 2004, 2006 and 2008, each time finishing a distant fourth. In 2011, however, he defeated Bloc Québecois incumbent Claude Guimond as part of the large NDP wave that swept through Quebec. He was appointed chairperson of the NDP's Quebec caucus following the election.

After the 2015 election, Caron was appointed the NDP critic for Finance, the Atlantic Canada Opportunities Agency, as well as deputy critic for Fisheries, Oceans, and the Canadian Coast Guard in the 42nd Canadian Parliament.

Caron resigned from the NDP shadow cabinet in February 2017 to stand for the leadership of the New Democratic Party to succeed Tom Mulcair.  Caron stated that the two major challenges confronting Canadians are income inequality and climate change. His leadership platform included a guaranteed basic income. In the October 1, 2017, election, Caron placed fourth with 9.4% of the vote, with Jagmeet Singh winning on the first ballot. The other two contestants in the leadership election, MPs Charlie Angus and Niki Ashton, came second and third respectively. Caron lost his seat in the 2019 Canadian federal election.

In November 2020, Caron announced his campaign for Mayor of Rimouski in the following year's municipal election, hoping to succeed retiring Mayor Marc Parent. He won the election on November 7, 2021.

Policies

Tax policy 
Guy Caron released a tax plan called Making Taxes Work for Canadians as part of his ongoing NDP leadership bid. The plan proposes the creation of a Tax Crimes Division within the Department of Justice Canada, in order to provide a more robust method of preventing tax evasion. In addition, the tax plan proposes a Financial Activities Tax to tax the profits of financial institutions and the renumeration packages of banking executives. Caron's plan also proposes the elimination of the "CEO stock option loophole," a promise made by the Liberal Party of Canada in the 2015 federal election.

Basic income 
Guy Caron's bid for the NDP leadership also included a plan for basic income for individuals or families who spend at least 20% more of their income than the average on necessities such as food, shelter, and clothing (designated as the low-income cut-off line). The basic income program would be joined with the Canada Childcare Benefit and the Guaranteed Income Supplement, without affecting other programs.

Trade 
Guy Caron's NDP leadership website states that Caron will work for "trade deals that work for Canadians". The website also states that "trade is good, when the deals are done right".

Electoral record

Personal life
Caron has been married to Valerie Stansfield since 2006. They have two children. At the time of his 2011 election they lived in Gatineau, Quebec; following the election they purchased a property in Rimouski, within Caron's riding, though stayed in Aylmer while Parliament was in session.

References

External links
 Basic Income: an explainer by Guy Caron on the Broadbent Institute's website

1968 births
Living people
Members of the House of Commons of Canada from Quebec
New Democratic Party MPs
Mayors of Rimouski
Universal basic income activists
University of Ottawa alumni
Université du Québec à Montréal alumni
21st-century Canadian politicians